Georgia participated in the 2010 Winter Olympics in Vancouver, British Columbia, Canada. It marked the fifth time since gaining independence that Georgia sent a delegation, though it had previously competed since 1952 as a member of the Soviet Union. Eight athletes competed in three sports, with none of them winning a medal. On the day of the opening ceremony, Georgian luger Nodar Kumaritashvili died in an accident while practicing for the games.

Alpine skiing

Three athletes competed in skiing events: Iason Abramashvili and Jaba Gelashvili in both men's giant slalom and slalom, and Nino Tsiklauri in women's giant slalom and slalom.

Figure skating

Three athletes competed in two figure skating events for Georgia: Elene Gedevanishvili competed in ladies' singles, while Allison Reed and Otar Japaridze competed in ice dancing.

Reed and Japaridze qualified for the Olympics at the 2009 Nebelhorn Trophy, where they placed twelfth. Reed, originally from the United States, became a Georgian citizen in January 2010. They finished 22nd overall at the Olympics.

Luge

Two athletes were qualified for the luge, with both Levan Gureshidze and Nodar Kumaritashvili set to make their Olympics' debut. However, on February 12, the day of the Opening Ceremony, Kumaritashvili crashed during a training run and was killed. The Whistler Sliding Centre, which recorded some of the fastest speeds in luge, experienced several accidents occurred during training runs leading up to the start of the games. The International Luge Federation immediately called an emergency meeting after the incident, and all other training runs were called off for the day. Saying he "couldn't go on," Gureshidze withdrew from the competition out of respect for his teammate.

References

Olympics
Nations at the 2010 Winter Olympics
2010
Winter sports in Georgia (country)